Scaevola oxyclona, commonly known as tangled fanflower, is a spiny shrub in the family Goodeniaceae, native to Western Australia. It grows to between 0.1 and 1.5 metres high and produces blue to purple flowers from August to December in its native range. The species was first formally described in 1876 by Victorian Government Botanist Ferdinand von Mueller in the tenth volume of Fragmenta Phytographiae Australiae based on plant material collected at Frasers Range and Mount Benjamin.

References

oxyclona
Eudicots of Western Australia
Asterales of Australia
Plants described in 1876
Taxa named by Ferdinand von Mueller